Acanthocobitis (Paracanthocobitis) linypha also known as the sewing needle zipper loach is a species of ray-finned fish in the genus, or subgenus, Paracanthocobitis. This species is known from the Irrawaddy and Sittang basins in Myanmar.

References

linypha
Fish described in 2015
Taxa named by Randal Anthony Singer
Taxa named by Lawrence M. Page